Tuberolabium is a genus of epiphytic flowering plants from the orchid family, Orchidaceae. It is native to the Old World Tropics, including Assam, Indochina, Taiwan, Indonesia, New Guinea, Philippines, Queensland, the Cook Islands and Micronesia. Of the 18 known species, 7 are endemic to the Indonesian island of Sulawesi.

Species
Species accepted as of June 2014:

Tuberolabium binchinae P.O'Byrne & J.J.Verm. - Sulawesi
Tuberolabium brevirhachis (L.O.Williams) J.J.Wood - Luzon
Tuberolabium candidum P.O'Byrne - Sulawesi
Tuberolabium celebicum (Schltr.) J.J.Wood - Sulawesi
Tuberolabium coarctatum (King & Pantl.) J.J.Wood - Assam, Myanmar
Tuberolabium gamma P.O'Byrne & J.J.Verm. - Sulawesi
Tuberolabium guamense (Ames) J.J.Wood - Cook Islands, Mariana Islands
Tuberolabium kotoense Yamam. - Taiwan
Tuberolabium latriniforme P.O'Byrne & J.J.Verm. - Sulawesi
Tuberolabium minutum W.Suarez - Philippines
Tuberolabium pendulum P.O'Byrne & J.J.Verm. - Sulawesi
Tuberolabium phillipsii Choltco - Philippines
Tuberolabium rhopalorrhachis (Rchb.f.) J.J.Wood - Thailand, Vietnam, Malaysia, Borneo, Java, Sumatra, Philippines 
Tuberolabium rumphii (J.J.Sm.) J.J.Wood - Ambon, Buru
Tuberolabium sarcochiloides (Schltr.) Garay - Philippines, Maluku
Tuberolabium sinapicolor P.O'Byrne & J.J.Verm. - Sulawesi
Tuberolabium stellatum (M.A.Clem. & al.) J.J.Wood - Queensland
Tuberolabium woodii Choltco - Philippines

See also
 List of Orchidaceae genera

References

External links

Vandeae genera
Aeridinae